Ignatius Carbonnelle (1829–1889 was a Jesuit, mathematician and the founder of the Scientific Society of Brussels.

References

1829 births
1889 deaths
19th-century Belgian mathematicians
19th-century Belgian Jesuits